Châlons-en-Champagne station (French: Gare de Châlons-en-Champagne) is a railway station serving the commune of Châlons-en-Champagne, Marne department, eastern France. It is situated at kilometric point (KP) 172.214 on the Paris–Strasbourg railway. The station is served by regional trains towards Paris, Reims, Nancy and Chaumont.

History 
The railway section between Épernay and Châlons was inaugurated on 6 November 1849 by General Louis Eugène Cavaignac. The link between Châlons and Paris would turn into daily service four days later. The Paris–Strasbourg railway was subsequently inaugurated by Napoléon III on 17 July 1852.

In 2018, the SNCF estimated that the annual circulation through the station consisted of 717,835 passengers.

See also 

 List of SNCF stations in Grand Est

References

External links
 

Railway stations in Marne (department)
Railway stations in France opened in 1849